The Middlebury C.V. Starr Schools Abroad, operated by Middlebury College in 17 countries across 5 continents, offer overseas academic programs for undergraduates from various U.S. institutions, as well as graduate-level programs for students from the Middlebury College Language Schools and the Middlebury Institute of International Studies at Monterey. The first School was the School in Paris, opened in 1949.  The Middlebury C.V. Starr Schools have been endowed by the C.V. Starr Foundation.

Academic program

Programs vary in nature and in size.  All instruction is in the host country language and conforms to that country's educational approach. Students may study for one or two semesters and can combine an internship with academic study.  At many of the Schools, students can opt to directly enroll at a local university.

The Middlebury C.V. Starr Schools have an immersion-based approach to language and cultural acquisition.  All students must sign Middlebury's "Language Pledge," agreeing to exclusively use their target language for the duration of the program.

Locations

There are 38 Middlebury C.V. Starr Schools Abroad, located in 17 countries across 5 continents:

School in Argentina: Buenos Aires and Córdoba
School in Brazil: Belo Horizonte, Florianópolis, and Niteroi
School in Cameroon: Yaoundé
School in Chile: Concepción, La Serena, Santiago, Temuco, Valdivia, and Valparaíso
School in China: Beijing, Hangzhou, and Kunming
School in France: Paris, Poitiers, and Bordeaux
School in Germany: Berlin, Potsdam and Mainz
School in India: Delhi
School in Italy: Ferrara and Florence
School in Israel: Beer Sheva
School in Japan: Tokyo
School in Jordan: Amman
School in Morocco: Rabat
School in Russia: Irkutsk, Moscow, and Yaroslavl
School in Spain: Cordoba, Getafe, Logroño, and Madrid
School in Uruguay: Montevideo
School in United Kingdom: Oxford

There was also a school in Alexandria, Egypt until it closed after being evacuated during the 2011 revolution. The school in Egypt was replaced with a school in Rabat, Morocco, which opened in 2016.

Rankings

The 2011 Princeton Review ranked Middlebury's study abroad programs as the 6th most popular in the United States.

See also
 
Language school

References

External links
 C.V. Starr-Middlebury Schools Abroad
 Middlebury Language Schools
 Middlebury College
 Monterey Institute of International Studies

Language schools
Middlebury College